In mathematics, the Fekete problem is, given a natural number N and a real s ≥ 0, to find the points x1,...,xN on the 2-sphere  for which the s-energy, defined by

for s > 0 and by

for s = 0, is minimal. For s > 0, such points are called s-Fekete points, and for s = 0, logarithmic Fekete points (see ).
More generally, one can consider the same problem on the d-dimensional sphere, or on a Riemannian manifold (in which case ||xi −xj|| is replaced with the Riemannian distance between xi and xj).

The problem originated in the paper by  who considered the one-dimensional, s = 0 case, answering a question of Issai Schur.

References

Mathematical analysis
Approximation theory